Henry Knight (born Henry Austen, 27 May 1797 – 31 May 1843) was a nephew of Jane Austen and an English cricketer who played for Sussex. He was born in Rowling near Goodnestone and died in Kent.

He was the third son of Jane Austen's brother Edward Austen Knight.

He joined the Army in 1818 as a cornet, was promoted lieutenant in 1821, captain in 1823 and half-pay major in 1826. He retired in 1837.

Knight made a single first-class appearance for Sussex, in 1827, against Kent. In the twelve-a-side match, Knight finished on 3 not out in the first innings, and did not bat in the second. His brothers, George Thomas, Edward and Brook and nephews Philip and Gerald Portal all played first-class cricket.

In 1832 he married Sophia Cage and had a son. After Sophia's death, he married Charlotte Northey, with whom he had a daughter.

References

External links
Henry Knight at Cricket Archive 

1796 births
1843 deaths
Austen family
People from Goodnestone, Dover
English cricketers
Sussex cricketers
Jane Austen
People from East Hampshire District